The Castro Theatre is a historic movie palace in the Castro District of San Francisco, California. The venue became San Francisco Historic Landmark #100 in September 1976.  Located at 429 Castro Street, it was built in 1922 with a California Churrigueresque façade that pays homage—in its great arched central window surmounted by a scrolling pediment framing a niche—to the basilica of Mission Dolores nearby. Its designer, Timothy L. Pflueger, also designed Oakland's Paramount Theater and other movie theaters in California during that period. The theater has over 1,400 seats (approx 800 downstairs and 600 in the balcony). The theater's ceiling is the last known leatherette ceiling in the United States and possibly the world. Another leatherette ceiling was demolished just a few years ago. To make the ceiling look as though it is leather requires a special technique regarded as lost today.

Location and history
The Castro Theatre originally opened at 479 Castro Street in 1910. It was subsequently remodeled into a retail store (currently occupied by Cliff's Variety, since 1971) in the mid-1920s after the larger Castro Theatre was built at 429 Castro Street, its current location, only a few doors up from the original theatre.

The Castro Theatre is located on Castro Street near the intersection of Market and 17th Streets, across from the Castro Street Station on the Muni Metro subway.

The new Castro Theatre opened on June 22, 1922, for an invitation-only screening, with Mayor James "Sunny Jim" Rolph in attendance, of the Paramount Pictures release Across the Continent (1922), starring Wallace Reid. The new Castro Theatre opened the following day to the general public.

The Nasser brothers, who built the theatre and whose family members still own it, also owned several other movie houses in the San Francisco area. The interior is luxurious and ornate, with subtly convex and concave walls and ceilings, and a dramatic "Mighty Wurlitzer" pipe organ that is played before films and events. The large neon "Castro" sign is emblematic of both the theatre and the Castro District.

Current events
Until the COVID pandemic lockdown early in 2020, the Castro Theatre hosted repertory movies, film festivals, and special events, often with an LGBT and multicultural focus, such as the San Francisco International Film Festival, Frameline: the SF International Lesbian and Gay Film Festival, Noir City: The Film Noir Festival, the SF International Asian American Film Festival, the SF International South Asian Film Festival, Berlin and Beyond: German Film Festival, the San Francisco Jewish Film Festival, SF Indiefest, the San Francisco Silent Film Festival, Midnites For Maniacs, and the Shock It To Me! Classic Horror Film Festival. 

In recent years, the Castro Theatre also was the site for gala tributes to many legendary Hollywood stars including Tony Curtis, Ann-Margret, Debbie Reynolds, Mitzi Gaynor, Ann Miller, Kim Novak, Jane Russell, and Sandra Dee—many of the events produced by local impresario Marc Huestis.

In January 2008, for the filming of the Gus Van Sant biopic Milk, restorations were made to the neon on the theater's marquee and blade sign, and the facade was repainted. The movie about the life and times of Harvey Milk, the San Francisco city Supervisor who was California's first openly gay elected official (portrayed by actor Sean Penn, who won an Academy Award for his performance), had its world premiere at the theater in November 2008. 

The theater can project modern digital formats such as 4K DCP with 5.1 Dolby sound and can accurately reproduce the classic silent film experience by projecting custom frame rates anywhere between 12 and 30 frames per second, including the ability to speed up or slow down during a film. The Castro is capable of showing 70mm films and is one of the few theaters in the world that can show a 70mm film with separate DTS soundtrack.

APE partnership 
In January 2022, during an extended closure due to the COVID-19 pandemic, Berkeley-based concert promoter Another Planet Entertainment announced that it had leased the Castro Theater from Bay Properties, the theater's owner, to reopen in January 2023, refocusing on presenting live music, in addition to film, comedy, and other events. 

APE's management of the space raised questions about the hosting of movies at the theatre, as the local film community was anxious that the change could mean the end of the theatre's legacy as a repertory movie house. Complaints also arose over the future of the organ located there.

Historic preservation campaign

Plans for the Castro Theatre announced by APE also have produced sustained opposition from historic preservation advocates and promoters of LGBTQ intangible cultural heritage. APE has proposed destroying the historic configuration of the orchestra (the main floor of the auditorium) by demolishing or building over the historic raked floor and aisles to install flat terraces for standing-room music shows with optional temporary chairs. Although APE has offered various modifications to the plan since its initial proposal, none involve preserving the classic movie-palace seating. 

A "Save the Seats" campaign bringing together members of the international film community and the LGBTQ community has argued that the movie-palace seating is integral to the historic integrity of the Castro Theatre and that the venue can be run successfully without destroying the form of the orchestra which reflects its original configuration from 1922. Among the groups leading the campaign are the Castro Theatre Conservancy, an independent nonprofit; the Castro LGBTQ Cultural District, a City-recognized organization devoted to preserving and promoting the intangible LGBTQ cultural heritage of the Castro District; and the Friends of the Castro Theatre Coalition, an unincorporated association of community organizations and individuals.

Castro Symphonic Theatre Organ 
The organ was originally a Robert Morton, but it was removed in 1962. The Wurlitzer that became a symbol of the theatre was added in the 1980s, but was removed in 2015 after its owner decided to move to Sacramento, taking a quarter of the pipework with him. A 3-manual Allen was used as a temporary instrument while a major new installation was being undertaken. 

The new instrument is considered the largest hybrid organ ever built, with 7 manuals and over 400 registers available. The organ has just 1,200 physical pipes, borrowed from a Wurlitzer/Kimball instrument, as the 16 ranks that were meant to be installed proved too complex and expensive to restore. The size was meant to achieve a near-infinite tonal palette, and in addition to organ tone, the sixth manual is capable of controlling a virtual orchestra, with technology provided by Audio Impressions. The bottom manual was extended to 88 notes to be able to play a full compass piano.

Despite the larger instrument, the basic stops found on a theatre organ are being maintained. The theatre portion of the instrument will reflect the 37-rank Fox Specials that were offered by Wurlitzer in the 1920s. 

The console of the instrument was designed with ergonomics in mind, so that every tab can be reached during a performance, while the manuals are based on a mock-up design to ensure the best ergonomics for the performer.

The specifications are located here:

Gallery

See also
 List of San Francisco Designated Landmarks
 Roxie Cinema
 Victoria Theater

References

External links 

 

Cinemas and movie theaters in the San Francisco Bay Area
Theatres in San Francisco
Castro District, San Francisco
LGBT culture in San Francisco
San Francisco Designated Landmarks
Event venues established in 1922
Theatres completed in 1922
1922 establishments in California
Spanish Revival architecture in California